Sairin-ji (西琳寺) is a Buddhist temple in Habikino, Osaka Prefecture, Japan. It is affiliated with Kōyasan Shingon-shū, and was founded during the sixth century.

See also 
Historical Sites of Prince Shōtoku

Buddhist temples in Osaka Prefecture
Kōyasan Shingon temples